Syphrea is a genus of flea beetles in the family Chrysomelidae. There are about 100 described species, found in North America and the Neotropics.

Selected species
 Syphrea burgessi (Crotch, 1873)
 Syphrea flavicollis (Jacoby, 1884)
 Syphrea nana (Crotch, 1873)
 Syphrea nitidiventris (Fall, 1910)
 Syphrea speciosa (Olivier, 1818)

References

Further reading

 

Alticini
Chrysomelidae genera
Articles created by Qbugbot
Taxa named by Joseph Sugar Baly